Mass graves in Maribor were created in Maribor, Slovenia, during and after the Second World War. The three known mass graves in Maribor itself and six additional mass graves in the immediate vicinity include some of the largest mass graves in Europe.

Background
By the end of the war, Maribor was the most devastated major town in Yugoslavia. 

The remaining German-speaking population, except those that had actively collaborated with the resistance during the war, was summarily expelled following the end of the war in 1945. At the same time, Croatian Home Guard members and their relatives trying to escape from Yugoslavia were massacred in the Yugoslav Partisan death march of Nazi collaborators and buried in mass graves.

List of mass graves
Maribor is the site of several known mass graves associated with the Second World War:
It contains the remains of an unknown number of corpses. Its location was identified in 2002.
The Pond Mass Grave lies southwest of the city, at the site of a pond and adjacent woods. It contains the remains of unknown victims and its location was identified in 2002.
During freeway construction in 1999,  of the trench was excavated, revealing the remains of 1,179 victims, mostly Croatian soldiers. The first grave is in the Tezno forest in Maribor, and another five are in Dogoše.

References

History of Maribor
Mass graves in Slovenia
Aftermath of World War II in Slovenia
Massacres in Slovenia
World War II prisoner of war massacres
Massacres in Yugoslavia
Yugoslav war crimes